Alocasia venusta is a species of flowering plant in the family Araceae, found only in the vicinity of the limestone Niah Caves of northern Sarawak, Malaysia. A lithophyte with narrow, canoe-shaped leaves, it is considered obscure even by Alocasia enthusiasts and is rarely found in commerce.

References

venusta
Endemic flora of Borneo
Flora of Sarawak
Plants described in 1998